Jewish Heritage Trail in Białystok is a marked foot trail created in June 2008 in Białystok, Poland, by a group of students and doctorate candidates, who participate as volunteers at The University of Białystok Foundation.

One of the goals of the project was to generate social capital by engaging cooperation between local institutions and social groups. Project included: planning the trail, publicizing an informative booklet and map in printed and electronic version, building an interactive website of the project, marking the trail sites and opening the trail to the public with a walk around the city, publicizing teacher's materials.

Trail sites 

Cytron Palace (today's Historical Museum) – Tobacco Factory of Faiwel Janowski – Shmuel Synagogue – Jewish Female Gymnasium of Zinaida Chwoles – Białystok Palace Theatre – Jewish Hospital (now Maternity Hospital) – Białystok Trylling Palace – Zygmunt August Gymnasium (now Sigismund Augustus High School) – Sholem Aleichem Library – TOZ Sanatorium – The Hebrew Gymnasium (now Municipal Hospital) – Mansion (ul. Sienkiewicza 26A) – Apollo Cinema – Mansion (ul. Sienkiewicza 26A; now State Theatre Academy) – Gymnasium of Jozef Zeligman, Jozef Lebenhaft and Jakub Dereczynski – Gilarino Miniature Theatre – Mansions of Isaac Zabludowski – Linas Chailim Charity Association – House of the Zamenhof Family – Monument to Ludwik Zamenhof – Yitzhak Malmed Plaque – Druskin Gymnasium – The Heroes of the Ghetto Uprising Monument – Cytron Synagogue (now Art Gallery of the Slendzinskis) – Warynskiego Street – The Modern Cinema – House of the Jakub Szapiro Family – Nowik Palace in Białystok – Tarbut (today Maria Grzegorzewska Craft School) – Jewish Craft School (now The Faculty of Physics at The University of Białystok) – The Barbican Mission (today's Syrena cinema) – Białystok-Chanajki Quarter – Piaski Quarter – Rabbinical Cemetery (today's Central Park in Białystok) – Piaskower Synagogue – The Monument of the Great Synagogue – The City Hall – The Jewish Cemetery (Wschodnia street) – and the Cholera cemetery in Białystok.

People connected with Jewish heritage of Białystok 

During the trail planning, organizers chose personages significant in the city's history city history: artists, activists, politicians, scientists and Righteous among the Nations.
 Zygmunt Białostocki – composer, pianist
 Zygmunt Bobowski – painter, member of the artists' group Czapka Frygijska
 Wiktor Bubryk – dramatic director, manager of theatre of miniatures "Gilarino"
 Roza Bursztejn (Rosa Raisa) – operatic singer
 Izaak Celnikier – painter
 Józef Chazanowicz – doctor, Zionist activist, founder of National Library of Israel
 Molli Chwat – painter
 Zinaida Chwolesowa – foundress of female high school
 Szmuel Cytron – the manufacturer, founder of synagogue, original owner of palace near Warszawska 37
 Szymon Datner – historian
 Dawid Druskin – the founder of high school
 Michał Duniec – painter, member of the bialystokers artists' group Forma-Farba-Faktura
 Osip Dymow – dramatist
 Nachum Edelman – painter, member of the bialystokers artists' group Forma-Farba-Faktura
 Leo Fink – the manufacturer, activist of Jewish organizations in Australia
 Ester Gessen – the journalist, translator, author of the memoirs "Drogi, ktorych nie wybieramy"
 Chajka Grossman – fighter of the Białystok ghetto, Israeli politician
 Natan Gutman – painter
 Zbigniew Antoni Huzarski – Righteous among the Nations
 Fajwel Janowski – manufacturer
 Kalman Kaplansky – politician, human rights activist
 Boris Kaufman – movie operator, documentarian, Oscar laureate
 Józef Kerszman – ophthalmologist, social worker
 Gustaw Kerszman – microbiologist, geneticist
 Chaim Jakub Lipszyc – sculptor, painter
 Maxim Litvinov – Soviet diplomat
 Juliusz Krajewski – painter, member of the artists' group Czapka Frygijska
 Helena Malarewicz-Krajewska – painter, one of the first representatives of socialist realism
 Icchok Malmed – a hero of Białystok ghetto
 Zajnwel Messner – sculptor
 Hersz Mersik – creator of Białystok ghetto archive
 Szmuel Mohylewer – rabbi, founder of school and credit company
 Sonia Najman (Nora Ney) – actress
 Chaim Nowik – manufacturer, original owner of  palace near Lipowa 35
 Felicja Raszkin-Nowak – writer, survivor of the Białystok ghetto
 Bencjon Rabinowicz – painter
 Oskar Rozanecki – painter
 Albert Bruce Sabin – inventor of an oral polio vaccine
 Czesław Sadowski – painter, member of the Białystok artists' group Forma-Farba-Faktura
 Simon Segal – painter, graphic artist, designer of fabrics
 Menasze i Efraim Seidenbeutel – painters
 Hayyim Selig Slonimski – astronomer, inventor, grandfather of writer Antoni Słonimski
 Yitzhak Shamir – Prime Minister of Israel
 Jakub Szapiro – journalist, popularizer of Esperanto, founder of Ludwik Zamenhofs Association of Esperantists in Białystok
 Mordechaj Tenenbaum – leader of Białystok Ghetto Uprising
 Helena i Chaim Tryllingowie – the manufacturers, original owners of palace near Warszawska 7
 Ichiel Tynowicki – painter, member of the Białystok artists' group Forma-Farba-Faktura
 Max Weber – painter
 Izaak Zabłudowski – tradesman, philanthropist
 Ludwik Zamenhof – inventor of Esperanto  
 Józef Zeligman – founder of multicultural high school
  – the organizer of Habima Theatre, which had become the Jewish National Theater in Tel Aviv
 Henryk Złotkowski – Righteous Among the Nations

References

External links

 Official website (polish and english version)
 View over Jewish Cemetery in Białystok from the drone

History of Białystok
Jewish Polish history
Jews and Judaism in Białystok
Tourist attractions in Podlaskie Voivodeship
Urban heritage trails